Takayuki Shimizu may refer to:

 Takayuki Shimizu (baseball) (清水 隆行) (born 1973), Japanese former professional baseball outfielder and current coach
 Takayuki Shimizu (politician) (清水 貴之) (born 1974), Japanese politician, member of the House of Councillors